Ashna Sarkar (born 1992) is a British journalist and libertarian communist political activist. She is a senior editor at Novara Media and teaches at the Sandberg Institute in Amsterdam. Sarkar is a contributor to The Guardian and The Independent.

Early life and education 
Ashna Sarkar was born in London in 1992. Her great-great-aunt, Pritilata Waddedar, was a Bengali nationalist who participated in armed struggle against the British Empire in 1930s Bengal. Her grandmother is a hospital carer. Her mother is a social worker who was an anti-racist and trade union activist in the 1970s and 1980s, helping to organise marches after the racially motivated murder of Altab Ali.

She attended Enfield County School, an all-girls comprehensive school, before moving to the Latymer School, a selective grammar school for sixth form education. She has undergraduate and master's degrees in English literature from University College London.

Career
Sarkar is a senior editor at Novara Media and teaches at the Sandberg Institute in Amsterdam. In 2017, she taught global politics at Anglia Ruskin University as an associate lecturer.

She is a contributor to The Guardian and The Independent. She has been a panelist on BBC Question Time and Any Questions?. She is a frequent panellist on Moral Maze.

Sarkar appeared in the 2019 BBC documentary series Rise of the Nazis to "illuminate the context and perspective of Ernst Thälmann, the leader of the Communist Party of Germany (KPD) from 1925 to 1933, who died in a concentration camp in 1944".

In July 2021, Bloomsbury said it would publish Sarkar's debut book, Minority Rule.

Writings and commentary

In her writings and commentary, Sarkar has expressed anti-imperialist, feminist, anti-fascist, and libertarian communist views. She has taken part in anti-racist, anti-fascist and anti-Trump protests and in 2018 joined a hunger strike to protest against the detention of asylum seekers at Yarl's Wood Immigration Removal Centre. She supported the Stansted 15's actions against deportation flights.

After a clip of her telling Piers Morgan on Good Morning Britain that she was "literally a communist!" went viral, Sarkar clarified her views as libertarian communist, a "long termist" who supports the former Labour Party leader Jeremy Corbyn's anti-austerity policies. Sarkar has described her view on communism as being "about the desire to see the coercive structures of state dismantled, while also having fun. It's not about driving everybody down to the same level of abjection, but making aesthetic pleasures and luxuries available to all."

Sarkar uses humour and London slang liberally in her writing and broadcasting. She says politics "should be joyful and exuberant".

Although she only became a Labour Party member during the UK general election campaign in late 2019, Sarkar (and Novara Media more generally) has become closely associated in media commentary with Corbyn's democratic socialist project: The Times has described her as "Britain's loudest Corbynista". Shortly before Labour's loss in the 2019 United Kingdom general election, Sarkar argued in The Guardian that young people in precarious employment would turn out for Corbyn's party. Sarkar announced that she had left the Labour Party in September 2021.

In November 2017, Sarkar spoke at a World Transformed festival. One of her fellow speakers, Paolo Gerbaudo, said that "the hatred in society was taken out on the wrong people" and that he wanted to "make the left hate again", pointing to Philip May, husband of the then–Prime Minister, as a legitimate target because he worked for a large investment manager. In response, Sarkar said "I'm on Team Hate".

In January 2018, during a debate with Conservative MP Andrew Rosindell, Sarkar jokingly said that "God Save the Queen" is "not the catchiest of national anthems. I would much prefer 'Wearing My Rolex'… a grime banger". According to Vice News, this made Piers Morgan "apoplectic with rage".

In September 2018, Sarkar defended anti-Zionist activist Ewa Jasiewicz, who, together with Yonatan Shapira, had once painted "Free Gaza and Palestine, liberate all ghettos" onto a wall of the Warsaw Ghetto. Jasiewicz was scheduled to speak at a Momentum conference that was running alongside the official Labour conference. Sarkar wrote on Twitter that Jasiewicz and Shapira's words were anti-racist, not anti-semitic. In 2019, Sarkar said that, on reflection, she should have "drawn a line between defending Ewa, criticising the coverage and being more critical of the action itself which I don't think was well thought out".

In a 2018 interview with Teen Vogue, Sarkar described herself as being a "fierce critic" of the prison industrial complex, military industrial complex, the expanded use of drone warfare and the expansion of deportation under both Barack Obama and Donald Trump. She said the loss of jobs due to automation could give rise to fascism as a way of controlling the "surplus disposable population". Alternatively, the extra time created by automation could liberate people to "imagine different ways of living" and "pursu[ing] your passions".

On 16 March 2021, Sunday Telegraph columnist Julie Burchill was ordered to pay 'substantial damages' to Sarkar after writing posts alleging that Sarkar sympathised with fundamentalist Islam and that she worshipped a paedophile in the Islamic prophet Muhammad. Burchill also wrote a sexual poem about Sarkar, 'liked' Facebook posts saying that Sarkar should kill herself and suggested that she was a victim of female genital mutilation. Sarkar wrote in The Guardian that the abuse had affected her mental health and that she had been prescribed anti-anxiety drugs for the first time in her life. Sarkar said she had no part in the decision by the publishers Little, Brown to cancel Burchill's book contract. She also wrote: "The media's reporting of the issue ignored the defamation, racism and harassment in favour of framing me as part of the woke mob—and Burchill as its victim." An apology published by Burchill included, "I should not have sent these tweets, some of which included racist and misogynist comments regarding Ms Sarkar's appearance and her sex life" and acknowledged that it was her publisher, not Sarkar, who was responsible for the cancellation of her book deal.

Personal life
Sarkar lives in North London and is a Tottenham Hotspur supporter. She is Muslim and she has said: "I pray, I meditate – it's loosey-goosey, pick'n'mix spirituality probably, if I'm being honest with myself; but for me the name I can give to it is 'Islam'."

References

External links
 Ash Sarkar's profile on The Guardian
 Ash Sarkar's profile on The Independent
 

1992 births
21st-century British non-fiction writers
21st-century English women
21st-century English people
Academics of Anglia Ruskin University
Alumni of University College London
British media critics
English anti-fascists
English columnists
English feminists
English Muslims
English non-fiction writers
English people of Bengali descent
English social commentators
English women journalists
The Guardian journalists
Left-wing politics in the United Kingdom
Living people
British opinion journalists
People educated at The Latymer School
British women columnists
British communists
English communists
Novara Media
British republicans